The men's 4 × 400 metres relay at the 2017 Asian Athletics Championships was held on 9 July.

Medalists

*Athletes who ran in heats only

Results

Heats
Qualification rule: First 3 in each heat (Q) and the next 2 fastest (q) qualified for the final.

Final

References

2017 Asian Athletics Championships
Relays at the Asian Athletics Championships